Dewin may refer to:
Pierre Dewin, Belgian water polo player
Dewin, Iran, a village in Hamadan Province, Iran